"Last Dance/The Hustle/On The Radio"  is the second single released from the motion picture soundtrack Selena (1997). The medley was recorded live on February 26, 1995 at the Houston Astrodome. It became Selena's final live recording before she was murdered on March 31, 1995. It interpolates the songs "Last Dance" and "On the Radio" by Donna Summer, "The Hustle" by Van McCoy and the Soul City Symphony, and "I Will Survive" by Gloria Gaynor and "Funkytown" by Lipps Inc.

Chart performance
The track reached #25 on the Hot Latin Singles Chart.

References

1997 singles
Selena songs
Spanish-language songs
Songs written by Van McCoy
Songs written by Donna Summer
Songs written by Paul Jabara
Music medleys
Song recordings produced by Bebu Silvetti
Songs released posthumously